Deniş Coal Mine is a lignite mine located in the Manisa Province in Turkey and is owned by the state lignite company TKİ. It is one of the Aegean (Lignite) coal mines which is the fossil fuel project which emit the most greenhouse gas in Turkey.

References

External links 

 Aegean coal mines on Global Energy Monitor

Coal mines in Turkey
Manisa Province
Soma District